Johann Jacob Dillen Dillenius (1684 – 2 April 1747) was a German botanist. He is known for his Hortus Elthamensis ("Eltham Garden") on the rare plants around Eltham, London, and for his Historia muscorum ("History of Mosses"), a natural history of lower plants including mosses, liverworts, hornworts, lycopods, algae, lichens and fungi.

Biography 

Dillenius was born at Darmstadt and was educated at the University of Giessen, earlier the family name had been changed from Dillen to Dillenius. In 1721, at the instance of the botanist William Sherard (1659–1728), he moved to England. In 1734 Dillenius was appointed Sherardian professor of botany at Oxford, in accordance with the will of Sherard, who at his death in 1728 left the university £3000 for the endowment of the chair, as well as his library and herbarium, all on the condition that Dillenius should be appointed the first professor.

Dillenius died at Oxford, of apoplexy. His manuscripts, books and collections of dried plants, with many drawings, were bought by his successor at Oxford, Dr. Humphry Sibthorp (1713–1797), and ultimately passed into the possession of Oxford University. For an account of his collections preserved at Oxford, see The Dillenian Herbaria, by G. Claridge Druce (Oxford, 1907).

Work 

At Giessen Dillenius wrote botanical papers for the Ephemerides naturae curiosorum. He printed, in 1719, his flora of the university's surroundings, a Catalogus plantarum sponte circa Gissam nascentium, illustrated with figures he had personally drawn and engraved, with descriptions of several new species.

In 1724 Dillenius published the third edition of John Ray's Synopsis Methodica Stirpium Britannicarum. It incorporated plant species discovered by Samuel Brewer, and work on mosses by Adam Buddle. It remained a standard reference for British botanists until the appearance of Carl Linnaeus's Species Plantarum in 1761.

Hortus Elthamensis 

In 1732 he published Hortus Elthamensis, a substantial catalogue in two volumes of some 400 plants growing at Eltham, London, in the collection of Sherard's younger brother, James (1666—1738), who, after making a fortune as an apothecary, devoted himself to gardening and music. For this work Dillenius himself drew and engraved 324 plates, containing 417 figures of the plants. The title called the plants "rare", but the botanist Will Tjaden comments that they were "often only uncommon and not always of very recent introduction." The book was described by Linnaeus, who spent a month with him at Oxford in 1736, and afterwards dedicated his Critica Botanica to him, as opus botanicum quo absolutius mundus non vidit, "a botanical work of which the world has not seen one more authoritative". Linnaeus later named a genus of tropical tree Dillenia in his honour.

Historia muscorum 

Dillenius wrote Historia muscorum (1741), a natural history of lower plants including mosses, liverworts, hornworts, lycopods, algae, lichens and fungi. He acknowledged the help of George Charles Deering. They had met at John Martyn's club for botanists, and had studied fungi together.

Honours 

In 1753, Carl Linnaeus in his Species Plantarum published Dillenia, a genus of flowering plants in the family Dilleniaceae, native to tropical and subtropical regions of southern Asia, Australasia, and the Indian Ocean islands, both genus and family named in Dillenius's honour.

In 1997, the Spanish botanist Gerardo Antonio Aymard Corredor published Neodillenia, a genus of flowering plants from South America belonging to the family Dilleniaceae, named in Dillenius's honour.

Selected publications 

 
 also on Gallica
 
 Facsimile edition 1973 , Ray Society, London. With introduction by William T. Stearn.

References

Bibliography 

 Illustrations from Johann Jacob Dillenius Hortus Elthamensis 1732
 Dictionary of Scientific Biography

1687 births
1747 deaths
Bryologists
German bryologists
Pteridologists
German pteridologists
Botanists with author abbreviations
18th-century German botanists
German mycologists
Fellows of the Royal Society
18th-century German people
18th-century German scientists
Sherardian Professors of Botany